This is a list of state highways in the U.S. state of California that existed before the 1964 renumbering. It includes routes that were defined by the California State Legislature but never built, and is sorted by the unmarked legislative route number. For details on routes added before 1931, see history of California's state highway system#List of route numbers, 1917-1931; the dates given here are when the numbers were assigned (1916 for routes added in the first two bond issues, 1917 for routes added by the legislature before 1917).

Legislative Routes


Sign routes

See also

References
Howe & Peters, Engineers' Report to California State Automobile Association Covering the Work of the California Highway Commission for the Period 1911-1920, pp. 11–16

 List pre-1964